is a passenger railway station in the city of Uwajima, Ehime Prefecture, Japan. It is operated by JR Shikoku and has the station number "G45".

Lines

Layout
The station, which is unstaffed, consists of a side platform serving a single track. A shelter is provided on the platform for waiting passengers. A short ramp leads up to the platform from the access road. A parking area and bike shed are provided.

Adjacent stations

History
With the nationalization of Uwajima Railway on 1 August 1933, the station came under the control of Japanese Government Railways (JGR), later becoming Japanese National Railways (JNR).

With the privatization of JNR on 1 April 1987, control passed to JR Shikoku.

Surrounding area
 , the 41st temple on the Shikoku Pilgrimage trail is about 1.5 km to the north of the station.

See also
 List of railway stations in Japan

References

External links
Station timetable

Railway stations in Ehime Prefecture
Yodo Line
Railway stations in Japan opened in 1914
Uwajima, Ehime